Ermine in heraldry is a "fur", a type of tincture, consisting of a white background with a pattern of black shapes representing the winter coat of the stoat (a species of weasel with white fur and a black-tipped tail). The linings of medieval coronation cloaks and some other garments, usually reserved for use by high-ranking peers and royalty, were made by sewing many ermine furs together to produce a luxurious white fur with patterns of hanging black-tipped tails. Due largely to the association of the ermine fur with the linings of coronation cloaks, crowns and peerage caps, the heraldic tincture of ermine was usually reserved to similar applications in heraldry (i.e., the linings of crowns and chapeaux and of the royal canopy). In heraldry it has become especially associated with the Duchy of Brittany and breton heraldry.

Ermine spots

The ermine spot, the conventional heraldic representation of the tail, has had a wide variety of shapes over the centuries; its most usual representation has three tufts at the end (bottom), converges to a point at the root (top), and is attached by three studs.  When "ermine" is specified as the tincture of the field (or occasionally of a charge), the spots are part of the tincture itself, rather than a semé or pattern of charges.  The ermine spot (so specified), however, may also be used singly as a mobile charge, or as a mark of distinction signifying the absence of a blood relationship.

On a bend ermine, the tails follow the line of the bend. In the arms of William John Uncles, the field ermine is cut into bendlike strips by the three bendlets azure, so the ermine tails are (unusually) depicted bendwise.

Later variations
Though ermine and vair were the two furs used in early armoury, other variations of these developed later. Both in continental heraldry and British, the fur pattern was used in varying colours as a blazon atop other tinctures (e.g., "" for black ermine spots on a gold field).

British heraldry created three names for specific variants, rather than blazoning them longhand. Ermines is the reverse of ermine – a field sable semé of ermine-spots argent; it is sometimes called counter-ermine (cf. French  and German ). Erminois is ermine with a field or (gold) instead of argent (silver), and pean is the reverse of erminois (i.e., or spots on a field sable).

Erminites is alleged to be the "same as ermine, except that the two lateral hairs of each spot are red." James Parker mentions it, as does Pimbley, though by the former's admission this is of doubtful existence. Arthur Charles Fox-Davies describes it as a "silly [invention] of former heraldic writers, not of former heralds."

Legendary origin
A etiological legend explaining the origin of the use of ermine in heraldry was given during the funeral orations of Anne of Brittany in 1514. In the oration, Guillaume Parvi traced Anne's ancestry back to Innogen, the daughter of Greek king Pandrasus and wife of Brutus of Troy from Geoffrey of Monmouth's pseudo-history Historia Regum Britanniae.

See also
 Flag of Brittany
 Flag of Leicestershire
 Flag of Norfolk
 Flag of Shropshire
 Coat of arms of the University of Cambridge
 Ó Donnagáin coat of arms
 Chudleigh coat of arms

References

Bibliography

External links
Koninklijke en Vorstelijke Mode, House of Orange web site, an article  on royal fashion, with much attention to ermine-lined velvet cloaks and mantels
Practical Advice On The Choice Of Furs. No. 4. Ermine. Continued, from Every Woman's Encyclopaedia, an article detailing the fashion and history of ermine coats and cloaks

Furs
Visual motifs